Carl Bearden (born January 18, 1956) is a Missouri Republican politician who was the Speaker pro Tempore for the Missouri House of Representatives from 2005 to 2007.  He lives in St. Charles, Missouri, with his wife, Deborah.  They have two children, Amber and Allison.

He is a member of the Waypoint Church of Harvester, Missouri, IEEE, AOPA, and the American Legislative Exchange Council (ALEC).

Education and work experience
He is a graduate of Southern Illinois University-Carbondale, with a B.S. in industrial technology.  He served in the United States Air Force for 6 years.  He currently owns and operates a consulting company.

Bearden is the founder of the Management and Fiscal Policy Commission, and has formerly served on the Missouri Association of Counties board of directors, the St. Charles County Master Plan 2010 Committee and the St. Charles County charter review commission.

President of the board of Heya Wellness, a developing Missouri medical Marijuana company.

Public service
Carl Bearden is the founder and chief executive officer of United for Missouri's Future and United for Missouri.  The organizations were founded in July 2010 for the specific purpose of educating, communicating. and activating (United for Missouri) Missourians on and about fiscal and limited government issues.  The organizations have nearly 80,000 members who participate in a wide variety of educational and issue advocacy issues.

Mr. Bearden also served as the state director of Americans for Prosperity from the summer of 2007 through July 2010.  He tripled the membership of the Missouri Chapter engaging Missourians from all across the state to become effective participants in their government.

Carl Bearden was elected to the Missouri House in 2000. He served as budget chair and Speaker Pro Tem during his time in the legislature.  He is best known for being a consistent conservative leader and for his time as budget chair when he changed the budget process resulting in more accurate revenue estimates and reduced spending.

Prior to entering the legislature, Mr. Bearden served on the St Charles County Council beginning at its inception in 1992. Serving as the first chairman of the county council for the first three years of its existence, his leadership led to more controlled growth of county government resources and a reduction in county-wide property taxes.

Mr. Bearden has worked at various positions in the private sector from large corporations to startups including owning his own company since 1998.  His experience in the private sector provided him with a broad array of knowledge and application of good fiscal management techniques which he applied to his elected positions.

Carl Bearden served six years in the US Air Force.

Carl and his wife Debbie have two daughters, a son-in-law, and five grandchildren.

References

Official Manual, State of Missouri, 2005-2006. Jefferson City, MO: Secretary of State.

External links
 - United for Missouri

1956 births
Living people
People from St. Charles, Missouri
Southern Illinois University Carbondale alumni
Republican Party members of the Missouri House of Representatives
Baptists from Missouri
United States Air Force airmen